The stance of a vehicle is determined by its suspension height and the fitment of the wheels in the fender arches. It may refer to any vehicle, including sports cars, pickup trucks and off-road vehicles, however it is mostly associated with lowered sports cars, sedans, hatchbacks, vans and other body styles of passenger cars. The term stance is most commonly associated with the stanced car subculture, a style of modifying cars which emphasizes lowering cars, typically with either coilovers or air suspension, and often adding negative camber to the wheels to achieve the "stanced" look. The main parameters of the vehicle's stance are suspension height and position of the wheels. Suspension height usually depends on the suspension components while wheel position usually depends on the rim size and offset. Tire fitment also plays a big role from both visual and functional perspective.

Customization Style

The term "stance" or "stanced" is often used to describe a car customization style. The term "stance" is often used in conjunction with "slammed" or "lowered". Key elements of the stance style are: lowered suspension (lowering springs, coilovers or air suspension), stretched tires and negative camber. Oftentimes, the main purpose of a stanced car project is to achieve an improved visual appeal rather than improved performance characteristics or handling, however some cars combine both. Stance is related to other modification styles such as JDM (Japanese Domestic Market), Euro style and VIP style.

A popular lowered stance customization that first emerged in the 1940s was the taildragger car, described by Motor Trend as follows:

Negative Camber

Camber is a measurement from the centerline of the wheel/tire relative to the road's surface. Negative camber is when the top of the wheel/tire angles inward toward the center of the vehicle. When done sparingly, negative camber greatly improves the handling characteristics of a vehicle. It does this by keeping the center of the tire perpendicular to the road when the car is turning. Therefore, allowing the optimum amount of tire tread to contact the road. 

Conversely, negative camber will decrease tire grip in straight line acceleration and braking. This is due to the same reasoning, when the vehicle is not turning less tread will be in contact with the road or track, resulting in less grip and lost performance. Many drift cars, however, use negative camber on their front wheels for better handling characteristics as the negative camber keeps the contact patch of the tire perpendicular to the road when going through turns with much steering angle.

While most normal vehicles maintain about 0.5° - 1° of camber, in the stance community, some owners run up to 45° of negative camber to achieve the stance they are looking for.

Origin
Some sources credit the origin of the "stance" style to motorsport, stating that enthusiasts started seeking to modify their cars to replicate the low to the ground look of race cars, as typically, most racecars designed for race tracks feature low and stiff suspension along with light and wide sport wheels for better handling and cornering on the race tracks. 
If the original approach was based on the functional standpoint, modern modification style is often based on the visual standpoint. Extremely lowered cars tend to be show cars and typically do not play the role of daily driver or race car. Extreme body work, suspension and wheel setups often make them less comfortable to drive on public roads and sometimes unsafe.

Culture and Events

The origin of many of the key elements of modern "stance" style is typically credited to Japan, however, other countries previously have also had similar subcultures of car modification that developed largely independently of Japan, and as such, the true origins of "stance" is hard to pinpoint as the style has spread to many countries. Stance centric car shows are hosted around the world on most continents. Events happen yearly that host many stanced cars, such as Stancenation, Wörthersee Treffen, FittedUK, Wekfest, Raceism and H2Oi. There is also a significant stanced car presence at larger events such as SEMA, Tokyo Auto Salon and Osaka Auto Messe.

References 

Vehicle design